Kharazmi University (Daneshgah-e Xuarazmi) is a major public research university in Iran, named after Khwarizmi (c. 780–850), Persian mathematician, astronomer and geographer, offering a wide range of undergraduate and postgraduate programs in a variety of disciplines. Kharazmi University is considered as the oldest institution of higher education in Iran. It was established in 1919 as the Central Teachers' Institute and gained university status as Tarbiat Moallem University of Tehran in 1974. It changed its name to Kharazmi University on January 31, 2012.

In 2015, the University of Economic Sciences (founded in 1936) was merged into Kharazmi University as its faculty of management, faculty of financial sciences and faculty of economics. The university has two main campuses, the main campus including administration offices located in Tehran, another is in the Hesarak district of Karaj.

Kharazmi University School of Engineering won international rankings of 601-800th in 2019, 2020, and 2021. It ranked 6th and 10th in industrial incomes among Iranian universities in 2020 for Civil Engineering and Education.

History 
The first teacher training institution for primary schools in Iran was established as Darol-Mo'allemin Markazi (Central college of Teachers) in the building of the Culture Ministry in Takht-e-Zomorod area of Tehran in 1919. With the increase in the number of schools in Iran and the increasing need for trained teachers, Darol-Mo'allemin Markazi was developed into Darol-Mo'allemin Aali (Higher college of Teachers) at the Higher Council for Sciences in October 1926. In December 1927, the Iranian Parliament passed a law to modify the statute of the latter institution to support it further and help employ its graduates nationwide. From then on, Darol-Mo'allemin Aali was divided into the two major ‘sciences' and ‘literary' departments.

In 1932 and with expansion of the courses offered, Darol-Mo'allemin Aali moved to Negarestan building, which had, as part of the Negarestan Garden, started its history as the summer residence of Fath-Ali Shah Qajar, the second king of the Qajar dynasty in 1808. Darol-Mo'allemin Aali changed its name to Daneshsaraye Aali (Higher Training College) in 1933. In 1963, the board of ministers supplanted the Danesh-Saraye-Ali with the organization for Teacher Education and Educational Research. The organization was rebadged again as Danesh-Saraye-Ali, however, and came to be sponsored by the Ministry of Higher Education after the latter was founded in the country in 1967. In 1974, with the approval of the Council for the Expansion of Higher Education at the Ministry of Higher Education, Danesh-saraye-ali turned into Teacher Training University with its own dedicated board of trustees.

The university was subsequently assigned with the task of developing teacher education programmes across the country and Danesh-Saraye-Alis or Higher Training Colleges were duly established in Zahedan, Sanandaj and Yazd and the Science Schools in Arak and Kashan were affiliated with Teacher Training University. The two final branches of the university were finally established in Sabzevar and Tabriz in 1987 and 1989 respectively.

In 1990, all the higher education institutions affiliated with or established by Teacher Training University were separated from and granted independence by the Council for the Expansion of Higher Education at the Ministry of Higher Education. The university changed its name to Kharazmi University January 2012 to further expand and strengthen the educational and research activities at the university, the University of Economic Sciences was incorporated into Kharazmi University according to the decision made on March 15, 2015, at the Council for the Expansion of Higher Education at the Ministry of Science, Research and Technology.

Campuses

Tehran Campus 

The Tehran Campus has as one of its attractions national the heritage building designed by the Russian-Iranian architect Nikolai Markov in the late 1920s—is located in an area of 2 square kilometers on Mofatteh Ave. This place is located in central Tehran.

Karaj Campus 

With the increase in the courses offered and the activities at the university generally the construction of a second campus started in 1977 in the city of Karaj, west of the province of Tehran. The Karaj Campus covers almost 200 hectares of land and it includes, in addition to a central administrative building, the buildings of the Faculty of Science, Faculty of Engineering, Faculty of  Mathematics and Computer Science, Faculty of Psychology and Education, Faculty of Education and Literature and Faculty of Humanities as well as student dormitories, staff houses, recreational facilities and other installations. The university's board of trustees approved of the foundation of another independent campus in Tehran in Nov. 2012 with the purpose of further expanding the university's research and educational activities and boost the number of students admitted in its postgraduate programmes. The construction of purpose-built and dedicated buildings for the faculty of Chemistry, Psychology, Engineering and Life Science are soon to start.

Structure 
The chancellor of the university is Azizollah Habibi. The university has 5 deputy departments, 16 faculties, 4 research institutes, 4 research centers, and 2 national centers of research excellence. There are 450 members of academic staff: 40 professors, 90 associate professors, 287 assistant professors, and 33 instructors. There are more than 900 non-academic staff members.

Faculties 
The university has the following faculties:
Faculty of Physical Education and Sport Sciences
Faculty of Physics
Faculty of Mathematical Sciences and Computer
Faculty of Geographical Sciences
Faculty of Management
Faculty of Psychology and Education
Faculty of Law and Political Sciences
Faculty of Biological Sciences
Faculty of Earth Sciences
Faculty of Chemistry
Faculty of Literature and Languages
Faculty of Engineering
Faculty of Financial Sciences
Faculty of Economics
Faculty of Humanities and Social Science
Faculty of Art and Architecture

Research Institutes  

 Institute for Educational Research: the institute was established in 1969. It publishes a number of ISSN educational and research publications including The Educational Research Quarterly and The Education Index, yearbooks and indices of psychology and education. 
 Dr. Mosaheb Institute for Mathematical Research: the institute was established in 1965; it is active in the fields of fundamental research in pure and applied mathematics, computer science and statistics at a global level, is in touch with mathematical research institutes in other countries, organizes scientific seminars and research workshops, publishes research done by the institute's scholars and educates scholars and instructors of mathematics for the universities across the country. Institute for 
 Foreign Language Research: the institute carries out research projects in the area of languages and applied linguistics, develops the facilities necessary for the promotion and publication of research done by postgraduate students of languages at master's and Phd levels and publishes the biannual Iranian Journal of Applied Linguistics. 
 Bahar Institute for Persian Language and Literature Research: the institute was established in 2004 and is active in the fields of Persian literature, language, writing and language skills and computer research in literature. It plans to develop an ISI-style database for scientific articles on Persian language, literature and culture, establish an electronic database for Persian texts. The institute is also concerned with  the state of Persian language and literature teaching and evaluating research priorities in the field of Persian language and literature. 
 Research Centers of National Excellence: provide paradigms of organized research activity by select members of the academic staff of select universities in the country capable of carrying out high-profile scientific activity in applied or fundamental sciences. They focus and organize their activities in highly specialized fields to innovate and achieve scientific excellence in at the national, regional and international level to meet the country's urgent research needs.
 Research Center of National Excellence for the Spatial Analysis of Environmental Disasters: The center deals with both human and natural disasters which would collectively include natural phenomena such as floods, storms, torrential rains, in- and out-of season freezing periods, spread of unknown and strange diseases and hundreds of disasters resulting from undue human activity.
 Research Center of National Excellence for Stress Psychology: The center was established in 2005 in accordance with the plan developed by the department of psychology at the university and approved by the relevant Research Centers of National Excellence across the country. It has the following objectives:  Theoretical objectives: Scientific participation to develop boundaries of knowledge in the field and educating the required committed and experts to meet society's needs in this regard  Executive objectives: this includes, among other objectives, the publication of two government-authorized research journals from 2007.  Research centers.   
 Plasma Research Center: the center was established in 2005. It has received Ministry permission to work on the charged particles instrument and microwave lamps and plasma in the solid state. The center is at present active in the fields of plasma engineering, nanotechnology and space physics.
 Fundamental and Applied Science Research Center: the center was established in 2005 to further take advantage of the capabilities and potentials in the fields of fundamental and applied sciences at the university and to help achieve the objectives of the fourth economic, social and cultural development for the expansion of research in the country. There are at present photonic and the solid state, cellular-molecular and genetic and paleontology and economic geology research departments at the center.
 Human Kinetics Research Center: the center was established in 2006 with 11 members of academic staff. It is active in the following areas:  -Development and expansion of research in Physical Education and Sports Sciences  -Promotion of research activities in Physical Education and Sports Sciences to boost the general academic level and help theory and practice come together in the field  -Cooperation with other research and educational centers in the areas of Physical Education and Sports Sciences to promote the quality of researches done in the field  -Cooperation with other institutions and organizations involved directly or indirectly in sports for the people.  
 Comparative Philosophy and Law Research Center: the center was established in 2007 with Human rights, Comparative philosophy and Comparative Law departments. It has the following objectives: Acquaintance with different viewpoints across the academic centers of the world in the fields of law and philosophy, transfer of global experiences in law and philosophy, particularly modern legal achievements in the world. To present and compare Islam's legal and philosophical potentials and strengths with other schools of law and philosophy to develop a better understanding of our native legal and philosophical systems in scientific centers.

Engineering 
The Faculty of Engineering at Kharazmi University was established in 2003 with the aim of training capable and creative engineers using the highest educational and research standards to prepare them to provide specialized services related to the specialty and by continuing their studies up to the doctoral level. At present, the school has four departments: Electrical and Computer Engineering, Civil Engineering, Industrial Engineering and Mechanical Engineering, at the undergraduate, graduate and doctoral levels.

The faculty pursues its goals with significant laboratory, laboratory and research facilities and equipment. The Technical College has a new building under construction with about 9000 square meters of infrastructure.

Civil Engineering 
Kharazmi University's Department of Civil Engineering, as the first department of the faculty, started its activities in 2003 with the launch of the Master of Geotechnical Engineering. The group currently accepts students in seven majors: geotechnics, structures, environment, earthquake, hydraulic and hydraulic structures, roads and transportation, engineering and construction management. The group also accepted students in October 2009 through the national entrance exam for the bachelor's degree in civil engineering and from October 2013 for the doctoral degree in the fields of civil engineering and geotechnics.

The laboratories of this group include research facilities required to conduct applied research in various fields of civil engineering:

 Civil Engineering Group Laboratories 
 Soil Mechanics Laboratory
 Concrete Technology Laboratory
 Material Strength Laboratory
 Hydraulic and Environmental Laboratories
 Road and Transportation Laboratory

Industrial Engineering 
Department of Industrial Engineering was established in 2006. Currently, the group accepts students in the majors of: systems optimization, logistics and supply chain engineering, engineering management, and socioeconomic systems engineering.

The group also accepted students in October 2009 through the national entrance examination for a bachelor's degree in industrial engineering and from October 2013 for a doctoral student.

The group held the Twelfth International Conference on Industrial Engineering on February 26 and February 27, 2016. The group also publishes the scientific journal Journal of Supply of the International Journal (IJSOM).

Electrical and Computer Engineering 
The Computer Engineering Department started its activity in 1995 by accepting students in the field of Computer Engineering (Software). After establishing the Faculty of Engineering in 2007, the department left the Faculty of Mathematics and continued its activities in the Faculty of Engineering. 

At present, this group of electrical and computer engineering, in addition to a bachelor's degree in software engineering, is called software orientation, master's degree in computer engineering in both artificial intelligence and computer systems architecture, and in the master's degree in electrical engineering.

The laboratories of this group have the research facilities required to conduct applied research in various fields of electrical and computer engineering.

Mechanical Engineering 
The Department of Mechanical Engineering started its activities in 2012 with the start of the Master of Applied Design Engineering.  Also, this group accepted undergraduate students in mechanical engineering through the national entrance exam in October 2014. The laboratories of this group have the research facilities required to conduct applied research in various fields in the field of mechanical engineering.

The laboratories of the Department of Mechanical Engineering include:

 Robotics Laboratory
 Vibration Laboratory
 Laboratory of Dynamics
 Laboratory of Liquids
 Laboratory of Thermodynamics
 Laboratory of Mechanical Engineering Future Programs

See also
 Higher education in Iran
 List of Iranian Universities
 Dar ul-Funun (Persia)

References

External links

Official website in English

Kharazmi University
Educational institutions established in 1919
Karaj
Education in Alborz Province
Buildings and structures in Alborz Province
1919 establishments in Iran
Education in Tehran Province